Cau or CAU may refer to:

Mythology 
Cau (bull), a legendary bull in Meitei mythology

People 
 Jean Cau (rower) (1874–?), French Olympic rower
 Jean Cau (writer) (1925–1993), French writer and journalist
 Jean-Michel Cau, French footballer

Universities 
 Carlos Albizu University, Florida, USA
 Central Agricultural University, India
 China Agricultural University, Beijing, China
 Christian-Albrecht University of Kiel, Germany
 Chung-Ang University, Seoul, South Korea
 Clark Atlanta University, Georgia, USA

Transport 
 CAU, the IATA code for Caruaru Airport, Pernambuco, Brazil
 CAU, the National Rail code for Causeland railway station, Cornwall, UK

Sport 
 CAU Rugby Valencia, a rugby club in eastern Spain
 Confederación Atlética del Uruguay, the Uruguayan Athletics Confederation
 Cricket Association of Uttarakhand, the governing body for cricket in Uttarakhand, India

Other 
 CUA, a codon for the amino acid histidine
 Cầu River in northern Vietnam
 CAU/LAM — "Controlled Access Unit/Lobe Attachment Module", a type of Token Ring connection

See also